Raczkiewicz is Polish surname:
 
 Władysław Raczkiewicz (1885-1947), Polish politician, lawyer, diplomat and first president of the Polish government-in-exile

Rackevičius

References 

Polish-language surnames